Kayak Island is one of the Canadian arctic islands in Nunavut, Canada within western Hudson Bay.

References

Islands of Hudson Bay
Uninhabited islands of Kivalliq Region